Canada Creek is a  stream in northeastern lower Michigan, having its origin at Valentine Lake in Briley Township in northern Montmorency County. It winds its way north through Montmorency Township then crosses into Allis Township in southwestern Presque Isle County before emptying into the Black River in Cheboygan County. Via the Black River and the Cheboygan River, Canada Creek's waters flow to Lake Huron.

Bordering on the creek in Montmorency County is the unincorporated community of Canada Creek Ranch, and two county roads, Canada Creek Hwy, and Canada Creek Rd., located in Presque Isle and Cheboygan counties respectively, are named for the creek.

References

Rivers of Michigan
Rivers of Montmorency County, Michigan
Rivers of Presque Isle County, Michigan
Rivers of Cheboygan County, Michigan
Tributaries of Lake Huron